Gemmotheres also known as the jewel-box pea crab,
is a monotypic genus of pea crab, which was erected in 1996 to hold the species Gemmotheres chamae (formerly Pinnotheres chamae). The species lives as a commensal of the corrugate jewelbox, Chama congregata.

References

Pinnotheroidea
Crustaceans of the Atlantic Ocean
Monotypic arthropod genera